Fair Game may refer to:

Film
 Fair Game (1928 film), a German silent drama film
 Fair Game (1986 film), an Australian action film
 Fair Game (1988 film), an Italian thriller-horror film
 Fair Game, a 1994 television film starring Lena Headey
 Fair Game (1995 film), an American action thriller
 Fair Game (2005 film), an American romantic comedy
 Fair Game (2010 film), an American biographical political drama

Literature
 "Fair Game" (short story), a 1959 short story by Philip K. Dick
 Fair Game (memoir), a 2007 book by Valerie Plame Wilson; basis for the 2010 film (see above)
 Fair Game, a 1974 novel by Paula Gosling; basis for the 1995 film (see above)
 Fair Game, a 2012 fantasy novel by Patricia Briggs

Music
 Fair Game, a 1990s American band fronted by Ron Keel
 Fair Game (EP), by the Sports, 1978
 "Fair Game", a song by Crosby, Stills & Nash from CSN, 1977

Television episodes
 "Fair Game" (Falcon Crest), 1986
 "Fair Game" (Heartbeat), 1994
 "Fair Game" (Homeland), 2017
 "Fair Game" (The King of Queens), 2000
 "Fair Game" (Nash Bridges), 2001
 "Fair Game" (Stargate SG-1), 1999

Other uses 
 Fair Game (radio), a 2007–2008 Public Radio International program hosted by Faith Salie
 Fair Game (Scientology), a Church of Scientology policy
 Fair Game, a 1957 Broadway play starring Sam Levene

See also
 "Fare Game", a 2006 episode of CSI: NY